3 Melancholy Gypsys is an American hip hop group from Los Angeles, California. It consists of Eligh, Murs, and Scarub.

History
Eligh, Murs, and Scarub went to Alexander Hamilton High School. After forming 3 Melancholy Gypsys, they were incorporated into the crews Log Cabin and The Righteous Brothers. Until Log Cabin disbanded, the trio worked on music as 3 Melancholy Gypsys and Log Cabin for a while. Around 1995, the three would meet again and reunite in Oakland at the Outhouse where the Living Legends crew was taking shape.

Discography

Studio albums
 Gypsy's Luck (1998)
 Grand Caravan to the Rim of the World (2005)

Live albums
 Live in Tokyo (2000)

EPs
 Bac for No Good Reason (1996) 
 Comurshul (1996) 
 The Penguins (1998)

Guest appearances
 Murs - "Done Deal" from The End of the Beginning (2002)
 Mums the Word - "Follow the Path" from Constant Evolution (2005)

Compilation appearances
 "Low Key" on Tags of the Times 3 (2001)
 "Aspirations" on Creative Differences (2004)
 "F**k You Up" on Walk Like a Man (2005)
 "2010" on Legendary Music Volume 1 (2006)

References

External links
 
 3 Melancholy Gypsys at Alpha Pup Records

American hip hop groups
Musical groups from Los Angeles
Musical groups established in 1994
1994 establishments in California
American musical trios